Finley is a city in Steele County, North Dakota. It is the county seat of Steele County. The population was 401 at the 2020 census. Finley was founded in 1897.

History
Finley was founded in 1897. In 1911, a train wreck in Finley caused by a broken rail killed six and injured 13. In 1919, the county seat was transferred to Finley from Sherbrooke, North Dakota.

Geography
Finley is located at  (47.512779, -97.836957).

Demographics

2010 census
As of the census of 2010, there were 445 people in 206 households, including 125 families, in the city. The racial makup of the city was 95.7% White, 0.2% African American, 2.2% Native American, 0.7% from other races, and 1.1% from two or more races. Hispanic or Latino of any race were 0.7%.

Of the 206 households 25.7% had children under the age of 18 living with them, 49.0% were married couples living together, 5.8% had a female householder with no husband present, 5.8% had a male householder with no wife present, and 39.3% were non-families. 32.5% of households were one person and 19.9% were one person aged 65 or older. The average household size was 2.16 and the average family size was 2.67.

The median age was 45.9 years. 21.1% of residents were under the age of 18; 5.6% were between the ages of 18 and 24; 22.2% were from 25 to 44; 27.1% were from 45 to 64; and 23.8% were 65 or older. The gender makeup of the city was 49.4% male and 50.6% female.

2000 census
As of the census of 2000, there were 515 people in 224 households, including 144 families, in the city. The population density was 147.4 people per square mile (57.0/km). There were 256 housing units at an average density of 73.3 per square mile (28.3/km). The racial makup of the city was 97.28% White, 1.75% Native American, 0.39% from other races, and 0.58% from two or more races. Hispanic or Latino of any race were 0.19% of the population.

Of the 224 households 28.1% had children under the age of 18 living with them, 54.9% were married couples living together, 8.0% had a female householder with no husband present, and 35.7% were non-families. 32.6% of households were one person and 18.3% were one person aged 65 or older. The average household size was 2.30 and the average family size was 2.95.

The age distribution was 26.0% under the age of 18, 6.4% from 18 to 24, 19.2% from 25 to 44, 23.9% from 45 to 64, and 24.5% 65 or older. The median age was 43 years. For every 100 females, there were 95.8 males. For every 100 females age 18 and over, there were 89.6 males.

The median household income was $32,917 and the median family income was $43,417. Males had a median income of $34,844 versus $17,500 for females. The per capita income for the city was $17,989. About 10.1% of families and 10.7% of the population were below the poverty line, including 18.4% of those under age 18 and 3.7% of those age 65 or over.

Notable people
 LaurieBeth Hager, member of the North Dakota House of Representatives
 Harvey B. Knudson (1903–1978), attorney and justice of the North Dakota Supreme Court 
 Peter O. Sathre, attorney and 16th North Dakota Attorney General

References

External links
Finley 75th, diamond jubilee, 1897-1972 : from sod to mod from the Digital Horizons website

Cities in North Dakota
Cities in Steele County, North Dakota
County seats in North Dakota
Populated places established in 1896